Esilalei is an administrative ward in the Monduli district of the Arusha Region of Tanzania. The ward is composed of three villages, namely Esilalei, Losirwa and Oltukai.

Esilalei has experienced an exceptionally high population growth from 7,824 in 2002 to 15,793 in 2012. Such growth implies the population has more than doubled in just 10 years. Among the principal factors that have contributed to this increase –one of the fastest in the district– is the falling mortality rate.

In addition, most of the residents are Maasai whose semi-nomadic lifestyle typically perpetuates the desire to have many children and large families. Other factors include decreasing infant mortality rate due to relatively improved health care, early marriage, early motherhood, and insufficient education leading to extremely low use of family planning methods.

The current Esilalei ward councilor is Mr. Lemia Murani (2020–Present).

Every Sunday there's a market day at Oltukai village. However, the villages of Esilalei and Losirwa both conduct their market day every Thursday. In these markets the villagers are able to purchase all their necessities, including clothing, food, and livestock.

References

Wards of Monduli District
Wards of Arusha Region